Maksim Nikolayevich Lepskiy (born 8 April 1992) is a retired Russian professional football player who last played for Naftan Novopolotsk.

External links
 Player page by sportbox.ru  
 
 
 

1992 births
Living people
People from Yalta
Ukrainian emigrants to Russia
Russian footballers
Association football forwards
Russian expatriate footballers
Expatriate footballers in Belarus
Russian Premier League players
FC Rubin Kazan players
FC Sokol Saratov players
FC Rostov players
FC Khimki players
FC Naftan Novopolotsk players